Charles Henry Fletcher (aka Chas. H. Fletcher in company advertising) organized and led the Centaur Company, makers of "Fletcher's Castoria", serving as president and general manager.

Early life

He was born December 25, 1837, (according to most records) in New York City, New York.

Business career
As a boy of 13, Fletcher went to work for a proprietary medicine company.  In 1872 he managed to save enough to buy from a physician, Dr. Samuel Pitcher, the formula of a  laxative called Castoria.  With this formula, he made a fortune.

Originally marketed as Pitcher's Castoria, the product has had several names, notably Fletcher's own.

A little known fact is that he was sent south before the Civil War to collect debts by Demas Barnes.  He returned (successfully) just before Fort Sumter was attacked  (so shortly before April 12, 1861, he returned north).  Partly due to this success (and others both before and after), Barnes backed him in forming the Centaur Company.

Testimonials
"[The Centaur Company is] probably the largest proprietary medicine concern in the country, if not in the world.  Mr. Fletcher's name has become so identified with the product of the company that it is known all over the civilized world."

"Charles H. Fletcher['s] ... signature is perhaps better known than that of any other man of his day. ... The [Centaur] company's advertising is said to have created a new epoch in advertising, and among the famous slogans which made it world-known was 'Babies cry for it',"

Personal life 

He married Jemima Elizabeth Bright (September 10, 1848, England - May 8, 1932, Manhattan, New York) in 1866 (according to 1890 census records).  He had three daughters who lived to adulthood, Mymie (My-me) (May 16, 1868 in Brooklyn, New York - May 28, 1958 in Pasadena, California) who married the Reverend William Morrison (October 5, 1863 - January 4, 1915) who was the priest at Trinity Church in New York City, Lucille (December 16, 1873 in Brooklyn, New York - February 29, 1956, in East Orange, New Jersey) who married George Howard Betts (August 5, 1871, Brooklyn, New York - 8 Jul 1940 in Pinehurst, North Carolina) who was a cosmetics manufacturer,  Ettye (Et-E) (November 25, 1870 in Brooklyn, New York - December 7, 1929 in Orange, New Jersey) who married Albert Bryant also had large roles in the Centaur Company and Sterling Products later known Sterling Drug. Albert Bryant's sister, Sara Cone Bryant, was a well-known children's book author. Records indicated he had one daughter, Eva born about 1869 who died young and another child who is believed to have died at birth and was unnamed.

He had one sister, Catherine Gale Fletcher and two half-sisters, Fanny Fletcher and Lucille Bennett.
His house still stands and is privately owned on Berkeley Avenue in Orange, New Jersey. The house has seven full bathrooms.

Charles Henry Fletcher died April 9, 1922 in Orange, New Jersey. He was interred in Green-Wood Cemetery, Brooklyn, New York.

Related facts

 In 1884, the Centaur Company offered to pay for the pedestal for the Statue of Liberty when the Pedestal Fund Committee found itself short of money in return for placing "Castoria" on the base for one year. The offer was declined.
 Demas Barnes, a United States representative from New York, was one of the initial backers of Fletcher's Castoria and his daughter Mildred Barnes Bliss used portions of their share to build Dumbarton Oaks, in Georgetown, DC.
 Charles Henry Fletcher's son-in-law Albert Bryant began working for the Centaur Company (and later Sterling Products) in 1899 and retired from the company November 8, 1937.
 In July 1908 he received from Charles L. Seabury Company the "largest yacht in the world driven by motor power" at the time, the Jemima F. III which was approximately 111 feet in length, named for his wife, Jemima, a trend for large luxury yachts that continues.

References

1837 births
1922 deaths
Former yacht owners of New York City